Sultanpur may refer to the following places:

Bangladesh
 Sultanpur, Moulvibazar, a neighbourhood in the Moulvibazar District

India
 Sultanpur, District Rajkot, Gujarat
 Sultanpur, Haryana
 Sultanpur, Karnataka, a village
 Sultanpur, Madhya Pradesh, a town
 Sultanpur Lodhi, Punjab, a city
 Sultanpur (rural), a village in Kapurthala district, Punjab
 Sultanpur, Uttar Pradesh, a city
 Sultanpur district in Uttar Pradesh
 Sultanpur (Assembly constituency), an Uttar Pradesh Legislative Assembly constituency
 Sultanpur (Lok Sabha constituency), Uttar Pradesh
 Sultanpur, Uttarakhand, a town
 Sultanpur National Park, Haryana, India
 The name of the city of Warangal from c. 1323
 Sultanpur metro station, a Delhi Metro station
 Sultanpur panchayat, a Gram panchayat in Hajipur, Vaishali District, Bihar
 Sultanpur, Karimnagar, a Gram panchayat in Karimnagar district of state of Telangana, India

Pakistan
 Sultanpur, Jhelum,  Former Princely State & union council of Jhelum District in Punjab Province
 Sultanpur, Havelian, Abbottabad, a city next to Havelian, Abbottabad in KPK Province